Hadeon is the eighth studio album by Dutch death metal band Pestilence. It was released digitally on 26 January 2018, nearly two months ahead of its scheduled release date; a physical component of the album was released on 9 March 2018. Hadeon is the band's first album since their two-year hiatus from 2014 to 2016, and the first one since Malleus Maleficarum (1988) not to feature longtime lead and rhythm guitarist Patrick Uterwijk.

Track listing

Personnel
 Patrick Mameli – guitars, vocals
 Tilen Hudrap – bass
Septimiu Hărşan – drums
 Santiago Dobles – guitars

References

2018 albums
Pestilence (band) albums
Hammerheart Records albums